In the early morning of 22 May 2016, a 27-year-old male named Gregor Schallert committed a mass shooting at a music concert in Nenzing, Austria. He killed two civilians before taking his own life, injuring eleven others. According to media reports, the shooting was triggered by a heated argument between the perpetrator and a woman, allegedly his girlfriend.

Attack
At around 3:00 in the morning, the 27-year-old male got into a fight with a woman at the parking lot next to a music concert in Nenzing, in the Vorarlberg region of Austria, organised by a motorbike club. He then went to his car, got an illegal-obtained Zastava M92 AK-type assault rifle out of it and then moved into the concert crowd, opening fire. According to the police, 150 people were present at the concert ground at that time. After firing into the crowd, the perpetrator returned to the parking lot, where he took his own life. According to media reports, the woman involved in the argument was his girlfriend and remained unhurt. Two people were killed in the attack, while eleven were left injured. Two of the injured suffered life-threatening wounds. The two deceased victims were men, 33 and 48 years old respectively.

The police told the press that the perpetrator came from the region, but refused to make any statement about a past criminal record or whether he owned a licence for the weapon.

References

2016 mass shootings in Europe
2016 in Austria
Attacks on music venues
Mass shootings in Austria
May 2016 crimes in Europe
Murder in Austria
Murder–suicides in Europe
History of Vorarlberg
2016 murders in Austria